The 2nd Alaska State Legislature was elected November 8, 1960.

Sessions
1st session: January 23, 1961 – April 7, 1961
2nd session: January 23, 1962 – April 12, 1962

Alaska Senate

Make-up

Members

Leadership
Senate President: Frank Peratrovich (D-Klawock)
Majority Leader: Robert J. McNealy (D-Fairbanks)
Minority Leader: John B. Coghill (R-Nenana)

Alaska House of Representatives

Make-up

Members

Leadership
Speaker of the House: Warren A. Taylor (D-Fairbanks)
Majority Leader: Peter M. Deveau (D-Kodiak)
Minority Leader: Bruce Kendall (R-Anchorage)

Key Legislative Staff
Secretary of the Senate: Evelyn K. Stevenson
Chief Clerk of the House: Esther Reed
Executive Director of Legislative Council: John C. Doyle
Legislative Auditor: Robert Dyer

See also
 List of Alaska State Legislatures
 1st Alaska State Legislature, the legislature preceding this one
 3rd Alaska State Legislature, the legislature following this one
 List of governors of Alaska
 List of speakers of the Alaska House of Representatives
 {AKLeg.gov}

Notes

External links
 Roster of members for the Alaska Territorial and State Legislatures, 1913-2008

1961 establishments in Alaska
Alaska
1962 in Alaska
Alaska
1963 disestablishments in Alaska
02